The Ukrainian Wikipedia (Ukrainska Vikipediia) is the Ukrainian language edition of the free online encyclopedia, Wikipedia. The first article was written on January 30, 2004.  the Ukrainian Wikipedia has  articles and is the  largest Wikipedia edition.

 it is the second most visited language Wikipedia in Ukraine, with 90 million page views, behind the Russian Wikipedia, at 100 million page views. There is a long-term trend for the Ukrainian language edition to be increasingly favored in comparison to the historically dominant Russian language edition.

Quality of articles and popularity 
In the Ukrainian Wikipedia, one area of knowledge has been covered to an extent greater than all other Wikipedias — the subject of mining, due to the considerable contribution by one person, Volodymyr Biletsky, a professor at Donetsk National Technical University. Using the Mining Encyclopedia, Biletsky has contributed over 10,000 articles on the subject to Ukrainian Wikipedia. In 2013, the Institute of History of Ukraine at the National Academy of Science gave permission to the Ukrainian Wikipedia to use the digital version of the Encyclopedia of History of Ukraine that was published online. The Higher School Academy of Science and Forest Engineering also allowed Wikipedia to freely use their information resources.

Generally, before the 2014 Maidan Revolution, Ukrainian Wikipedia hold approximately the 10 to 20 percent of the pageviews from Ukraine, depending on the season and steadily growing, reaching for first time a share of above 20% in late 2013. The success of Euromaidan and the subsequent improvement in Ukrainian language's status have positively impacted the reach of Ukrainian Wikipedia.

One of the areas where activity is notable is in Wiki Loves Monuments project, an annual international photo contest focused on cultural and historical monuments. Ukrainian Wikipedians were ranked 4th among 36 participating countries for the number of uploads of images as part of this project in 2012. In 2014, Ukrainian Wikipedians were the winners of the contest that year.

 the Ukrainian Wikipedia is the second most popular Wikipedia in Ukraine, well below Russian, despite that both language versions have more than a million articles. This is attributed to the historic bilingualism in Ukraine, the Russification of Ukraine and the Ukrainian language during the Tsarist and Soviet era, and the popularity of Russian-language content and media in present-day Ukraine. However, the popularity of Ukrainian Wikipedia in Ukraine is increasing every year, compared to the Russian version. 

In January 2016, the ratio of Russian to Ukrainian Wikipedia use was 4.6 times, decreasing to 2.6 times in January 2019, 2.4 times in January 2020, and 2 times in January 2021. Extrapolation shows that in 2025, in Ukraine, the popularity of the Ukrainian Wikipedia will be higher than the popularity of the Russian Wikipedia.

Since the 2022 Russian invasion of Ukraine, the difference between the two languages has further decreased, and in October 2022 it was just ten million pageviews (100 million pageviews for Russian in Ukraine and 90 million pageviews for Ukrainian), the lowest ever recorded. Due to the fact that many students consult Ukrainian Wikipedia for information about the literature works, the writers and other parts of the school curriculum, the pageviews of Ukrainian Wikipedia are generally halving during the summer. This trend is observed in many other Wikipedias of the former Soviet space, including Kazakh and Uzbek ones. The impact of this trend tends however to decrease as of 2023.

Articles 
Some articles of the Ukrainian Wikipedia have been taken from various sources, such as the Encyclopedia of Ukrainian Studies(about 6500), the Ukrainian Soviet Encyclopedia, the Handbook of the History of Ukraine (edited by Podkova and Shust), the Encyclopedia of Mining of Volodymyr Biletskyy and from official sources of information of state institutions.

History of the Ukrainian language 
A significant number of articles in Ukrainian Wikipedia relate to the history of the development of the Ukrainian language. A study in August 2012 counted over 8,000 articles mentioning the term "Ukrainian language" and over 1,400 articles with the term "history of Ukrainian language" and concluded that collectively represented a good coverage of its history and concepts. Articles about the history of Ukrainian language included articles about early publications like bibles printed in Ukrainian, grammar books, changes in phonetics through time, Ukrainian calligraphy, history of Ukrainian language within the context of the Soviet Union, linguicide and the banning of Ukrainian language by the Russian Government.

History and science 
At the end of 2012, the Ukrainian Wikipedia contained over 1,500 articles relating to Ukrainian history.  the Ukrainian Wikipedia contained 52 specific articles about Ukrainian astronomers and astronomo-geodesists, which have now been collated into a published book.

Community
In average, approximately 20 thousand users make at least one edit in Ukrainian Wikipedia, and the most months have at least 3 thousand active users each. 

Despite that the population of Ukraine is decreasing, Ukrainian Wikipedia has recorded an ever-increasing amount of active contributors throughout the 2010s and the early 2020s. 

Wikimedia Ukraine is the chapter of Wikimedia foundation in Ukraine. It is charged with promoting Wikipedia in Ukraine. Apart from online editathons, Wikimedia Ukraine also hosts Wikimarathon, an article creation contest that includes article creation workshops which take place in various cities of Ukraine with the coordination of various Ukrainian Wikipedians. Wikimarathon takes place in late January, honouring the creation of Ukrainian Wikipedia in January 30th, 2004. Wikimarathon workshops, as well the contest itself, have received significant coverage from Ukrainian media. 

The most contributors of Ukrainian Wikipedia are from Ukraine. Many of them are from Kyiv, the capital of Ukraine. Other Ukrainian oblasts which constitute the homeland of many Ukrainian Wikipedians are Lviv and Donetsk oblasts.

Blackout 
On January 21, 2014, the Ukrainian Wikipedia community decided to block access to the portal every day between 4:00 and 4:30 PM in protest of "dictatorship laws" in Ukraine, that restrict the freedom of speech and pose a threat to the portal.

Statistics 

On October 1, 2005, Ukrainian Wikipedia reached the 20,000-article mark. The milestone of 250,000 articles was officially reached on 21 December 2010, and 860,000 people had viewed 30 million articles in that month alone.

By 2012, with over 400,000 articles and 100 million words, the Ukrainian Wikipedia by far had content larger than the largest printed encyclopedia at that time — the Ukrainian Soviet Encyclopedia.

On March 23, 2020, the Ukrainian Wikipedia reached 1,000,000 articles, when user Oleh Kushch published an article about American folk singer Odetta.

 the Ukrainian Wikipedia has  articles and nearly 3.6 million visitors every day. The Ukrainian Wikipedia at that time was on the 16th place in the ranking of the world's Wikipedias.

Milestones 

 January 30, 2004 — 1st article
 April 4, 2004 — 1,000 articles
 June 18, 2004 — 5,000 articles
 December 16, 2004 — 10,000 articles
 October 1, 2005 — 20,000 articles
 October 15, 2006 — 30,000 articles
 November 12, 2006 — 40,000 articles
 January 16, 2007 — 50,000 articles
 May 17, 2007 — 60,000 articles
 September 9, 2007 — 70,000 articles
 December 13, 2007 — 80,000 articles
 January 24, 2008 — 90,000 articles
 March 28, 2008 — 100,000 articles
 July 13, 2008 — 120,000 articles
 May 30, 2009 — 150,000 articles
 April 7, 2010 — 200,000 articles
 December 20, 2010 — 250,000 articles
 July 7, 2011 — 300,000 articles
 December 28, 2011 - 350 000 articles
 September 20, 2012 — 400,000 articles
 May 12, 2014 — 500,000 articles
 November 13, 2015 — 600,000 articles
 June 4, 2017 — 700,000 articles
 July 10, 2018 — 800,000 articles
 April 19, 2019 — 900,000 articles
 March 23, 2020 — 1,000,000 articles

Gallery

Notes

References

External links 

 List of Wikipedias and their ranking by number of articles
 Wikipedia Statistics Ukrainian
 Wikimedia Traffic Analysis Report - Wikipedia Page Views Per Country
 Ukrainian Wikipedia 
 Ukrainian Wikipedia mobile version 
 Wikipedia at Wikimedia Ukraine Weblog 
 Bozhena Sheremeta, Ukrainian Wikipedia hits growth peak with over 500,000 articles, Kyiv Post, November 24, 2014

Wikipedias by language
Ukrainian-language websites
Education in Ukraine
Internet properties established in 2004
Ukrainian-language encyclopedias